The government of the Indian state of Odisha and its 30 districts consists of an executive, led by the Governor of Odisha, a judiciary, and a legislative branch.

Like other states in India, the head of state of Odisha is the Governor, appointed by the President of India on the advice of the Central government, and their post is largely ceremonial. The Chief Minister is the head of government and is vested with most of the executive powers. Bhubaneswar is the capital of Odisha, and houses the Vidhan Sabha (Legislative Assembly) and the secretariat. The Orissa High Court, located in Cuttack, has jurisdiction over the whole state.

The present Legislative Assembly of Odisha is unicameral, consisting of 147 Member of the Legislative Assembly (M.L.A). Its term is 5 years, unless sooner dissolved.

The state of Odisha is represented at the centre by its 21 Member of Parliaments in the Lok Sabha and 10 Member of Parliaments in Rajya Sabha. There are 21 Lok Sabha constituencies from which candidates gets elected in the General Election to the Lok Sabha. The Members of Rajya Sabha were elected and / or nominated by the Member of Legislative Assembly through their parent political parties..

Departments

See also 
 Green card scheme in Odisha
 Invest Odisha
 Legislative Assembly of Odisha
 List of constituencies of Odisha Vidhan Sabha
 Make in Odisha

References

External links